Jane Scott may refer to:
Jane Scott, Duchess of Buccleuch (1929–2011), British peeress
Jane Scott (film producer), Australian film producer
Jane Scott, Baroness Scott of Bybrook (born 1947), British politician
Jane Scott (rock critic) (1919–2011), American rock critic
Jane Scott (theatre manager) (1779–1839), 19th century theater manager, actor, and playwright
Jane Scott, Countess of Dalkeith (1701–1729)
Jane Wooster Scott, American painter